Ben’Jamin Obadje also known as Spellz is a Nigerian recording producer. He has produced for artists including Chuddy K, 9ice, Banky W., D'Prince, Davido, Tiwa Savage, Dammy Krane. His production hits include "Gaga Crazy" by Chuddy K, "My Dear" by Dammy Krane, "Check and Balance" by Burna Boy, "Mummy Mi" by Wizkid, "How Long" by Davido, and "Keys to the City" by Tiwa Savage. He is currently signed to 323 Entertainment.

Thisday newspaper ranked him 10th on its 2016 list of the Top 10 Music Producers in Nigeria. On July 28, 2016, Nigerian Entertainment Today ranked him 7th on its monthly list for 10 music producers.

Personal life
Spellz engaged Hadiza Dije Badaki on August 31, 2015, and married on February 28, 2016. Spellz and Badaki had their first baby on February 16, 2017.

Education
He attended Federal Government College, Idoani in Ondo State and then studied Computer science at Covenant University. He left the University after three years because of his love for music.

Discography

Accolades

References 

Living people
Nigerian record producers
Musicians from Lagos State
Nigerian music industry executives
Covenant University alumni
Federal Government College Idoani alumni
Year of birth missing (living people)